Tomato yellow leaf curl China virus (TYLCCNV) is a virus which contains 25 isolates.  It infects plants as different as tobacco and tomato, as well as genetically modified plants.  Petunias can be infected, but show no symptoms.  The microbiology of the virus has been studied in the Chinese province of Yunnan. Tomato yellow leaf curl China virus belongs to the genus Begomovirus, which also contains the tomato leaf curl China virus.

The tomato yellow leaf curl China virus DNA sequence contains 2734 nucleotides and is transmitted by the whitefly Bemisia tabaci.

History
In 2007, it was reported for the first time ever that tomato yellow leaf curl China virus now infects the kidney bean in China.

In 2019, it emerged that the tomato yellow leaf curl China virus impairs photosynthesis in certain infected plants.

References

Begomovirus